Buhl is a city located on the old Oregon Trail in the western half of Twin Falls County, Idaho. The population was 4,122 at the time of the 2010 census, up from 3,985 in 2000. It is part of the Twin Falls, Idaho metropolitan area.

U.S. Route 30 passes through Buhl, along the scenic Thousand Springs Scenic Byway from Twin Falls to Bliss. Known as the "Trout Capital of the World," Buhl is the location of numerous hatcheries in the immediate surrounding area, which produce a majority of the rainbow trout consumed in the United States. Clear Springs Foods, located just north of Buhl, processes over 20 million pounds of rainbow trout each year, making it the world's largest producer.

History
Buhl was founded on April 17, 1906. It is named for Frank H. Buhl of Sharon, Pennsylvania, a major investor in a Carey Act project known as the Twin Falls South Side Project, which introduced large-scale irrigation to the Magic Valley in the early 20th century.

Geography

Climate
According to the Köppen Climate Classification system, Buhl has a semi-arid climate, abbreviated "BSk" on climate maps.

Demographics

2010 census
At the 2010 census there were 4,122 people in 1,596 households, including 1,029 families, in the city. The racial makup of the city was 81.9% White, 0.2% African American, 0.7% Native American, 0.2% Asian, 0.1% Pacific Islander, 13.8% from other races, and 3.1% from two or more races. Hispanic or Latino of any race were 24.9%.

Of the 1,596 households 34.3% had children under the age of 18 living with them, 47.9% were married couples living together, 12.3% had a female householder with no husband present, 4.2% had a male householder with no wife present, and 35.5% were non-families. 30.3% of households were one person and 15.5% were one person aged 65 or older. The average household size was 2.55 and the average family size was 3.23.

The median age was 35.4 years. 29.3% of residents were under the age of 18; 7.1% were between the ages of 18 and 24; 23.9% were from 25 to 44; 22.6% were from 45 to 64; and 17% were 65 or older. The gender makeup of the city was 48.7% male and 51.3% female.

2000 census
At the 2000 census there were 3,985 people in 1,561 households, including 1,045 families, in the city. The racial makup of the city was 86.80% White, 0.03% African American, 0.75% Native American, 0.73% Asian, 0.03% Pacific Islander, 9.16% from other races, and 2.51% from two or more races. Hispanic or Latino of any race were 15.76%.

Of the 1,561 households 33.3% had children under the age of 18 living with them, 52.0% were married couples living together, 9.9% had a female householder with no husband present, and 33.0% were non-families. 29.2% of households were one person and 17.8% were one person aged 65 or older. The average household size was 2.53 and the average family size was 3.14.

The age distribution was 28.5% under the age of 18, 8.9% from 18 to 24, 24.9% from 25 to 44, 18.7% from 45 to 64, and 19.0% 65 or older. The median age was 36 years. For every 100 females, there were 94.7 males. For every 100 females age 18 and over, there were 88.1 males.

The median household income was $28,644 and the median family income was $34,242. Males had a median income of $26,069 versus $17,069 for females. The per capita income for the city was $13,539. About 9.6% of families and 14.3% of the population were below the poverty line, including 17.6% of those under age 18 and 11.2% of those age 65 or over.

Notable people
 Eugene Scott (1921–2005), televangelist
 Marjorie Reynolds, actress

See also

 List of cities in Idaho

References

External links

 Buhl School District
 Buhl ID.com - local website
 Buhl Public Library
 Air Nav.com - Buhl Municipal Airport

Cities in Idaho
Cities in Twin Falls County, Idaho
Twin Falls, Idaho metropolitan area
Populated places established in 1906
1906 establishments in Idaho